The following page lists all power stations in Iceland. Nearly all of Iceland's electricity (>99%) is generated from renewables (mainly hydroelectric dams and geothermal). The islands of Grimsey and Flatey rely on diesel as they are not connected to the grid.

Hydroelectricity

Over 80% of electricity in Iceland is generated in hydroelectric power stations. The hydroelectric power stations, historically all run by Landsvirkjun, are central to the existence of Iceland as an industrialized country.

The largest power station by far is Kárahnjúkar Hydropower Plant (690 MW), which generates electricity in the area north of Vatnajökull for the production of aluminum.

Geothermal 
Iceland uses geothermal energy for heating as well as electricity generation.

See also 

 List of power stations in Europe
 List of largest power stations in the world

References

Iceland
 
Power stations